Mncedisi Lutando Wellington Filtane (died 22 November 2020) was a South African politician who served as a Member of the Eastern Cape Provincial Legislature from 2019 to 2020. Filtane was a Member of the National Assembly of South Africa between 2014 and 2019. Filtane was also the deputy national chairperson of the United Democratic Movement.

Parliamentary career
In 2014, Filtane was elected to the National Assembly via the United Democratic Movement's regional list. He was sworn in as a Member of Parliament on 21 May 2014.

Committee assignments
Ad Hoc Committee on Police Minister's Report on Nkandla
Powers and Privileges of Parliament
Portfolio Committee on Agriculture, Forestry and Fisheries (Alternate member)
Portfolio Committee on Public Works
Portfolio Committee on Rural Development and Land Reform
 Portfolio Committee on Sport and Recreation (Alternate member)

Member of the Eastern Cape Provincial Legislature
For the 2019 election, Filtane was the first candidate on the UDM's provincial list. He was elected to the Eastern Cape Provincial Legislature when the party won two seats.

Death
Filtane died from COVID-19 on 22 November 2020. His death was confirmed by the national president of the UDM, Bantu Holomisa.

Since his death, four of his family members have died from the virus. His son, brother, sister and brother-in-law Loyiso Mpumlwana (who served as an African National Congress MP) have all succumbed.

References

2020 deaths
Year of birth missing
Xhosa people
People from the Eastern Cape
United Democratic Movement (South Africa) politicians
Members of the National Assembly of South Africa
Members of the Eastern Cape Provincial Legislature
Deaths from the COVID-19 pandemic in South Africa